What Ever Happened to Baby Jane? is an American psychological horror novel by Henry Farrell published in 1960 by Rinehart & Company. The novel has earned a cult following, and has been adapted for the screen twice, in 1962 and 1991.

Plot
This Gothic story deals with two aging sisters, Jane and Blanche Hudson, who are living alone together in a decaying Hollywood mansion. A former child star of early vaudeville known as "Baby Jane", Jane was doted upon by her father due to her success on the stage while Blanche lived in her shadow, neglected. However, their roles were reversed after the death of their parents due to influenza when both children moved to Los Angeles to live with an aunt. Blanche was favored by directors for her blonde hair and regal beauty, and finally decided to pursue a successful film career. Blanche became a star, while Jane, whose attempts at making movies always resulted in failure, languished in her shadow. Blanche managed to keep her sister's career alive by having a clause in her contract stipulating that Jane have a role in every film in which Blanche appeared, but these were always minor parts that relegated Jane to the same neglect Blanche had suffered.

Years later, Jane, who still dresses as if she were 10 years old, and Blanche, disabled after a mysterious car accident, continue to live together in the same mansion in a declining neighborhood. Jane resents how her career has been all but forgotten compared to Blanche's (who became more famous than she ever was, and who is now being remembered because of a revival of her films on television), and hates having to cook, clean and care for her sister. Although stuck upstairs in her bedroom, Blanche has  managed to keep her good looks, and Jane's appearance is ravaged by years of alcoholism.

Blanche, whose only other contact with the outside world is Edna Stitt, the mansion's cleaning woman, and the telephone conversations she occasionally has with her doctor and attorney, realizes that Jane is becoming increasingly unstable. She calls her lawyer and tells him that she is planning to sell the house. Jane, who eavesdrops on her sister's calls, believes that Blanche intends to have her committed to a mental hospital. Blanche becomes aware of her sister's sinister mood swings and tries to explain her decision, but Jane simply ignores her. Soon, Jane begins to exhibit signs of insanity. She removes the phone from Blanche's room, and makes her afraid to eat by serving Blanche's dead pet bird on a salad and later a large rat from the cellar. In a drunken daze, Jane decides to resurrect her old Baby Jane stage act, reasoning that Fanny Brice had success with Baby Snooks. She hires a musical Edwin Flagg, an accompanist, through a help wanted ad.

As reality topples crazily into eerie fantasy, Jane begins to abuse her sister with monstrous cruelty and embezzles her money to buy liquor and finance her comeback. Edna becomes uneasy when she is unable to reach Blanche on the phone and Jane refuses to let her clean her sister's room. Opening the door to find Blanche tied to the bed with her mouth taped shut, she tries to help, but Jane sneaks up and kills Edna with a hammer. That night, Jane dumps the body. A day or two later, police officers ask questions to Jane about Edna's disappearance. Jane goes into a panic, grabs her barely conscious sister, and heads for the location of some of her happier childhood memories: the beach where she and her father used to practice her song-and-dance routine while crowds of onlookers watched. Jane plays in the sand, and Blanche lies weak and on the verge of death from starvation and abuse.

Realizing that she may be dying, Blanche reveals to Jane that it was she, not Jane, who was responsible for paralyzing her. After Jane humiliated Blanche at a party years earlier, her sister tried to run her over before Jane got out of the way. The car then slammed into a metal gate, snapping Blanche's spine. She managed to crawl out of the car to the gates, and Jane, frightened and drunk, hid inside the house, where she passed out. When the police arrived, they assumed that Jane had been driving. Blanche later realized that the event had driven her sister insane with guilt, but refused to allow her to seek psychiatric help for fear that Jane might recover enough to remember what really happened and then would leave her. Realizing that all the years of hatred and resentment between the sisters could have been avoided, Jane forgives Blanche.

Jane calls the police and tells them that her sister is very sick. Outside the phone booth, three officers recognize her and gently take Jane back to the beach. They start to question her and ask her where her sister is. At first, Jane vaguely tells them where to find Blanche, leading them to the beach. She then becomes confused and ignores their questions. Upon mentioning the name "Miss Hudson", Jane is taken to her vaudeville days, and she begins to dance "very prettily" despite the police's imploring her to tell them where Blanche is. The novel ends with Jane's dancing, and the book does not reveal if Blanche survives or not.

1962 film

What Ever Happened to Baby Jane? is a 1962 American psychological thriller-horror film film produced and directed by Robert Aldrich, starring Bette Davis and Joan Crawford, about an aging actress who holds her paraplegic sister captive in an old Hollywood mansion, with screenplay adapted by Lukas Heller. Upon the film's release, it was met with widespread critical and box-office acclaim, and was  nominated for five Academy Awards, winning one for Best Costume Design, Black and White.

The intensely bitter Hollywood rivalry between Davis and Crawford, the film's two stars, was heavily important to the film's initial success. This in part led to the revitalization of the then-waning careers of the two stars. In the years after release, critics continued to acclaim the film for its psychologically driven black comedy, camp, and creation of the psycho-biddy subgenre. The film's then-unheard of and controversial plot meant that it originally received an X rating in the UK.

1991 film

What Ever Happened to... is a 1991 American TV movie directed by David Greene and adapted for the small screen by Brian Taggert, based on the novel What Ever Happened to Baby Jane? by Henry Farrell and the 1962 theatrical film of the same name. It stars real-life sisters Lynn Redgrave as Baby Jane Hudson and Vanessa Redgrave as Blanche Hudson in the roles previously played by Bette Davis and Joan Crawford in the 1962 adaptation.

The film was adapted to contemporary times, with Blanche's film success taking place in the 1960s instead of the 1930s. Her films were being rediscovered on home video instead of television reruns. Jane had been a child film star (replacing the original's vaudeville success), but her films were unavailable, leading to her jealousy.

References

1960 American novels
American novels adapted into films
American thriller novels
Hollywood novels
Novels about actors
Novels set in Los Angeles
Rinehart & Company books
American gothic novels
American novels adapted into television shows